Pachydactylus mclachlani is a species of lizard in the family Gekkonidae. The species is endemic to Namibia.

Etymology
The specific name, mclachlani, is in honor of Geoffrey Roy McLachlan (1923–2005), who was a South African ornithologist and herpetologist.

Description
P. mclachlani is relatively large for its genus.

Reproduction
P. mclachlani is oviparous.

References

Further reading
Barts B, Colacicco F (2017). "Die Dickfingergeckos des südlichen Afrikas – Tiel XXI Pachydactylus mclachlani Bauer, Lamb & Branch, 2006, mit Amnerkungen zu Pachydactylus griffini Bauer Lamb & Branch, 2006 [=The Thick-toed Geckos of Southern Africa – Part XXI Pachydactylus mclachlani Bauer, Lamb & Branch, 2006, with notes on Pachydactylus griffini Bauer, Lamb & Branch, 2006]". Sauria 39 (1): 41–46.
Bauer AM, Lamb T, Branch WR (2006). "A Revision of the Pachydactylus serval and P. weberi Groups (Reptilia: Gekkota: Gekkonidae) of Southern Africa, with Description of Eight New Species". Proceedings of the California Academy of Sciences, Fourth Series 57 (23): 595–709. (Pachydactylus mclachlani, new species, pp. 670-673 + Figures 93–98 on pp. 637–639).

Pachydactylus
Geckos of Africa
Reptiles of Namibia
Endemic fauna of Namibia
Reptiles described in 2006
Taxa named by Aaron M. Bauer
Taxa named by William Roy Branch